The Statute Law Revision (No. 2) Act 1888 (51 & 52 Vict c 57) is an Act of the Parliament of the United Kingdom.

This Act was repealed by section 1(1) of, and Part XI of Schedule 1 to, the Statute Law (Repeals) Act 1989.

This Act was retained for the Republic of Ireland by section 2(2)(a) of, and Part 4 of Schedule 1 to, the Statute Law Revision Act 2007.

Section 5 of the Statute Law Revision Act 1890 provided that this Act was to be read and construed as if, in the entry in the Schedule to this Act relating to the 5 & 6 Will 4 c 26, the reference to sections 1 and 2 and 3 of the 5 & 6 Will 4 c 26 was replaced by a reference to sections 2 and 3 and 4 of the 5 & 6 Will 4 c 26.

Section 3 of the Statute Law Revision Act 1894 provided that the Second Schedule to that Act was to be substituted for so much of this Act and of the Statute Law Revision Act 1892 as related to the Small Debt (Scotland) Act 1837 and to the 4 & 5 Vict c 10, and that "the said Statute Law Revision Acts" were to be read and construed accordingly.

Section 2 - Application of repealed enactments in local courts
The words "to the court of the county palatine of Lancaster or" in this section were repealed by section 56(4) of, and Part II of Schedule 11 to, the Courts Act 1971. This section was repealed by section 32(4) of, and Part V of Schedule 5 to, the Administration of Justice Act 1977.

Schedule
The Schedule was repealed by section 1 of, and the Schedule to, the Statute Law Revision Act 1908.

See also
Statute Law Revision Act

References
Halsbury's Statutes,
The Public General Acts passed in the fifty-first and fifty-second years of the reign of Her Majesty Queen Victoria. HMSO. London. 1888. Pages 452 to 539.

External links
List of amendments and repeals in the Republic of Ireland from the Irish Statute Book.
The Statute Law Revision Act (No 2) 1888 (sic.), as applicable to New Zealand, from the Parliamentary Counsel Office.

United Kingdom Acts of Parliament 1888